Radio Sapientia 95.3FM Onitsha is a private commercial radio station founded on December 8, 2011, by Sapientia International Media Centre. It is situated in Onitsha, Anambra State and licensed by the Nigerian Broadcasting Commission.

Radio Sapientia covers about 18 states in its media services. These include the south-south and the core north. The station has started web broadcasting that streams live globally. Every year Radio Sapientia celebrates its anniversary, drawing crowd from all over the country with different entertainment groups and personalities. It has also added a TV channel in its broadcast.

Presenters
Uju Nwankwo
Chinonso Ahec-3 Ekuma
Joe Igbo
Cynthia Nwosa
Oma Chukwuemeka
Ogo Dike
Mac Davis
Jude Geoman
Jovia Uchenna
JJ Agada Aguzie
Ifeanyi Orakwue
Freshmann Jay Nwanze

Awards and nominations

References

Radio stations established in 2011
Radio stations in Nigeria
2011 establishments in Nigeria
Privately held companies of Nigeria
Radio stations in Onitsha